South West Cape may refer to:

 South West Cape, Tasmania, a cape at the south-west corner of Tasmania
 South West Cape, New Zealand, a cape on Stewart Island, New Zealand